Weald Brook is a water course in the parliamentary constituency of Hornchurch and Upminster. Weald Brook flows into the River Ingrebourne.

Weald Brook is the boundary between Romford and South Weald, to the east, flows south into Hornchurch, continuing as the River Ingrebourne to the Thames.

References

 

Geography of the London Borough of Havering
Parks and open spaces in the London Borough of Havering